The Nikitin NV-6, (a.k.a. UTI-6), was a single seat aerobatic biplane designed and produced in the USSR in 1940.

Development
Nikitin designed the NV-6 as an aerobatic aircraft which was unusual in the USSR in 1939. The fuselage of welded KhMA steel tubing, and lower wing were taken from the NV-1 sporting aircraft of 1933. A new wooden upper wing supported by I struts and cabanes, duralumin tail surfaces with fabric covering and cantilever faired  undercarriage attached to the fuselage completed the NV-6. Flight testing was begun by Nikitin and Schyevchyenko during December 1940 but the onset of the Great Patriotic War stopped further work.

Specifications (NV-6)

See also

References

 Gunston, Bill. “The Osprey Encyclopaedia of Russian Aircraft 1875–1995”. London, Osprey. 1995.

External links

1940s Soviet sport aircraft
NV-6
Biplanes
Aerobatic aircraft
Single-engined tractor aircraft
Aircraft first flown in 1940